Azara railway station is a small railway station in Azara, Guwahati, Assam. Its code is AZA. It serves Guwahati City. The station consists of 2 platforms.

References

External links

Transport in Guwahati
Railway stations in Guwahati
Lumding railway division